Yengi Qaleh (also Romanized as Yengī Qal‘eh) is a village in Kuhpayeh Rural District, Nowbaran District, Saveh County, Markazi Province, Iran. At the 2006 census, its population was 99, in 39 families.

References 

Populated places in Saveh County